25 is the fourth studio album by American rapper G Herbo. It was released on July 2, 2021, by Machine Entertainment and Republic Records. The album contains guest appearances from Polo G, Lil Tjay, 21 Savage, the Kid Laroi, Gunna, G Herbo's son Yosohn, and Rowdy Rebel. Production was handled by Southside, Ramsey Beatz, Chase Davis, Daniel Ivy, Hitmaka, SkipOnDaBeat, Turbo, Dougie on the Beat, Don Cannon, Tay Keith, Luca Vialli, Jake One, Hollywood Cole, and DeAvonte Kimble. The album serves as the follow-up to G Herbo's previous album, PTSD (2020). It was supported by three singles, "Statement", "Really Like That", and "Break Yoself", all of which are included as bonus tracks on the album. The album's title comes from G Herbo being 25 years old at the time of its release, and the death of a friend a week prior to his 25th birthday.

Background
The album is named after G Herbo's age at the time, 25. The title and number are important to him because his brother and fellow rapper, Gregory Jackson, known professionally as Lil Greg, died on January 28, exactly one week before he turned 25 years old on February 4. Comparing the album to his previous album, PTSD (2020), G Herbo stated that 25 sees him "in a different headspace" and he is "telling the story of where I am now and where I come from turning 25 years old". On the album, he "digs deep and speaks about his upbringing, his losses, his troubles, and his come-up in the rap game". He is also "celebrating his 25th year around the sun and reflecting on everything he's learned along the way". HipHopDX said G Herbo "harnesses the pain and transforms it into heartfelt trap ballads".

Release and promotion
On June 25, 2021, G Herbo announced the album along with its cover art and release date through a trailer video, while the tracklist also got leaked. He revealed the tracklist on June 30, 2021.

Singles
The lead single of the album, "Statement", was released on December 18, 2020. "Really Like That" and "Break Yoself" were released as the dual second singles on March 5, 2021. The singles are the last three tracks of the album in order.

Commercial performance
25 debuted at number five on the US Billboard 200, earning 46,000 album-equivalent units and becoming G Herbo's second top 10 and highest-charting album.

Track listing

Notes
  signifies an uncredited co-producer.

Charts

Weekly charts

Year-end charts

References

2021 albums
G Herbo albums
albums produced by Jake One
Trap music albums